List of parishes by province and commune for the Roman Catholic Archdiocese of Lucca.

Tuscany

Province of Lucca

Province of Pistoia

Pescia
S. Frediano (Aramo)
S. Bartolomeo (Collodi)
S. Michele (Fibbialla)
Santi Martino e Sisto (Medicina)
Santi Andrea e Lucia (Pontito)
S. Quirico (San Quirico Valleriana)
S. Maria Assunta (Stiappa)
Santi Quirico e Giulitta (Veneri)

References

Lucca